Nolin is an unincorporated community in Umatilla County, Oregon, United States. At one time the area was known as "Happy Canyon". Adam "Ad" W. Nye, a settler of the 1860s, named the Nolin area Happy Canyon, for the spirit of the people who lived there. The name was later adopted by Pendleton Round-Up for its indoor show in commemoration of this time. Nye was County Sheriff in 1872–74. The nearby community of Nye was named for him.

At one time Nolin had a post office, a store, and a school. Nolin also has a cemetery. An Oregon Railway and Navigation Company (now Union Pacific) railroad line was built through Nolin, crossing the Umatilla River on a steel bridge constructed in 1907.

The Cunningham Sheep Ranch, founded in the 1880s by Charles Cunningham, is based in Nolin. It was once one of the largest sheep-raising operations in the United States. Today it raises rambouillet sheep.

References

External links
Historic images of Nolin from the Oregon State University Extension Service
Images of trains on the Union Pacific at Nolin from Railpictures.net
Panorama of Nolin from Flickr, including Cunningham Sheep Company grain elevator
Images of Nolin from Flickr

Unincorporated communities in Umatilla County, Oregon
Ghost towns in Oregon
Unincorporated communities in Oregon